Dowrmishkhanlu (also Romanized as Dowrmīshkhānlū; also known as Dormīshkānlū) is a village in Bastamlu Rural District, in the Central District of Khoda Afarin County, East Azerbaijan Province, Iran. At the 2006 census, its population was 481, in 98 families. The village is populated by the Kurdish Chalabianlu tribe.

References 

Populated places in Khoda Afarin County
Kurdish settlements in East Azerbaijan Province